Great Britain competed in the 2020 Summer Paralympics in Tokyo, Japan.  Originally scheduled to take place between 21 August and 6 September 2020, the Games were postponed to  24 August to 5 September 2021 as a result of the COVID-19 pandemic. British athletes have competed at sixteen consecutive Summer Paralympics since 1960.

Sarah Storey, competing in her eighth Paralympics, won Great Britain's first gold medal of the Games, on the first day of competition, in the women's individual pursuit C5 cycling. It was Storey's fifteenth Paralympic gold medal, leaving her one behind Mike Kenny's British record of sixteen. On 31 August, Storey won her second gold of the Games in the Women's C-5 road time trial, winning her sixteenth Paralympic gold medal, and becoming Great Britain's most successful ever Paralympian, matching Mike Kenny's record of 16 gold medals, but exceeding his record in silver and bronze medals. Days later, Storey's third gold of the Games in the women's C4–5 road race moved her clear in the national all-time list on 17 gold medals.

Medallists

The following competitors won medals at the Games for Great Britain. 

| width="78%" align="left" valign="top" |

| width="22%" align="left" valign="top" |

Medals by sport

Medals by date

Medals by gender

Multiple medallists

The following Team GB competitors won several medals at the 2020 Paralympic Games.

Competitors
The following is the list of number of competitors participating in the Games:

Please note that guides in athletics and paratriathlon, competition partners in boccia and pilots in cycling are counted as athletes at the Paralympics.

* Two athletes Kadeena Cox (athletics and cycling) and George Peasgood (cycling and paratriathlon) are competing in two sports so the totals for each gender (-1) and the combined total (-2) have been reduced to reflect this.

Administration
On 13 June 2018, ParalympicsGB announced that Penny Briscoe would continue in the role of Chef de Mission which she had undertaken at the previous four summer and winter Paralympic Games for the British team.

Archery

Great Britain secured five quota places at the 2019 World Para Archery Championships in 's-Hertogenbosch. A further two quota places were earned in the World Archery Final Paralympic qualification event in 2021.
Men

|-
|align=left| John Stubbs
|align=left rowspan=2|Men's individual compound
|682
|19
|
| L 138-138
|colspan=4|Did not advance
|-
|align=left|Nathan MacQueen
|680
|22
|
| L 138-142
|colspan=4|Did not advance
|-
|align=left|David Phillips
|align=left|Men's individual recurve
|582
|26
| W 6-2
| W 7-3
| L 2-6
|colspan=3|Did not advance
|}

 John Stubbs was eliminated after a single arrow shoot out.

Women

|-
|align=left|Victoria Rumary
|align=left|Women's individual W1
|590
|6
|
| W 115-107
| W 130-124
| L 107-127
| W 131-123
|
|-
|align=left|Phoebe Paterson Pine
|align=left rowspan=2|Women's individual compound
|670
|16
| W 142-138
| W 141-140
| W 141-139
| W 140-137
| W 134-133
|
|-
|align=left|Jessica Stretton
|694
|1
|
| L 140-141
|colspan=4|Did not advance
|-
|align=left|Hazel Chaisty
|align=left|Women's individual recurve
|571
|12
| W 7-3
| W 6-5
| L 2-6
|colspan=3|Did not advance
|}

Team

Under Paralympic qualification rules, an NPC that has qualified an archer both men's and women's events in the same category will enter a mixed team (1 male, 1 female) into the relevant team event.

|- align=center
|align=left|Nathan MacQueenJessica Stretton
|align=left|Mixed team compound
|1374
|5
|  
|
| L 151-153
|colspan=3|Did not advance
|- align=center
|align=left|David PhillipsHazel Chaisty
|align=left|Mixed team recurve
|1153
|10
|  
| W 5-1
| L 0–6
|colspan=3|Did not advance
|}

Athletics

On 21 July 2021, 44 British athletes have been selected to compete at the Games.
Men's track

Men's field

Women's track

Women's field

Mixed

Badminton 

Great Britain qualified two quotas for badminton. In July the IPC confirmed that a further two players had received bipartite invitations as high ranked players.

Men

Boccia

Individual

Key – CP = Competition Partner

 Result was determined by a tie break ball.

Pairs and teams

Cycling

Great Britain have nominated 14 cyclists, and six sighted pilots to take part in the cycling events at the 2020 Paralympic Games. Included are two dual athletes, Kadeena Cox who will also take part in the Athletics programme, and George Peasgood who will take part in triathlon. Sarah Storey will return for her eighth Paralympic Games across swimming and cycling.

Road

 Track

 The Men's 1000 metres C1-3 time trial is a factored event. Although finishing 3rd after factoring, Jaco van Gass's time is recognised as a world record in his C3 classification.

 The Women's 500 metres C4–5 time trial is a factored event. Kadeena Cox's time is a world record in her C4 classification.

Equestrian

Great Britain have qualified 4 riders for the team event after winning a bronze medal in the 2018 FEI World Equestrian Games. A fifth individual rider is also qualified.

Individual

Team

Judo

Paracanoeing

Great Britain earned quota places for the following races at the 2019 ICF Canoe Sprint World Championships. Further qualification will be available at the 2020 ICF Paracanoe World Championships. On 8 June 2021, Paralympics GB announced the selection of the eight paracanoeists who will represent Great Britain in Tokyo.

Paratriathlon

The following athletes earned quota places for Great Britain in paratriathlon at the 2020 Summer Paralympics.

Powerlifting

Rowing

Great Britain qualified three boats for each of the following rowing classes into the Paralympic regatta. All of them qualified after successfully entering the top seven for men's single sculls and top eight for mixed events at the 2019 World Rowing Championships in Ottensheim, Austria.

On 25 June 2021, Great Britain selected eight rowers to compete.

Qualification Legend: FA=Final A (medal); FB=Final B (non-medal); R=Repechage

Shooting

Great Britain have qualified slots for shooting during the 2018 World Shooting Para Sport Championships and the 2018 World Shooting Para Sport World Cup. On 13 January 2021, Paralympics GB announced the selection of six shooters to compete in Tokyo. James Bevis, Ryan Cockbill, Tim Jeffery, Matt Skelhon, Issy Bailey and Lorraine Lambert were the first athletes to be chosen for the British team competing in Tokyo.

Swimming

On 30 June 2021, 23 British swimmers are qualified to compete at the 2020 Summer Paralympics. Alice Tai withdrew from competition following an elbow injury.
Men

Women

Mixed

Table tennis

Great Britain entered nine athletes into the table tennis competition at the games. Rob Davies qualified from the 2019 ITTF European Para Championships which was held in Helsingborg, Sweden and the other eight athletes qualified via World Ranking allocation.
Men

Women

Teams

{|class=wikitable style="font-size:95%"
|-
!rowspan="2"|Athletes
!rowspan="2"|Event
!Round of 16
!Quarterfinals
!Semifinals
!colspan="2"|Final / 
|-
!OppositionResult
!OppositionResult
!OppositionResult
!OppositionResult
!Rank
|-align=center
|align=left|Sue BaileyMegan Shackleton
|align=left|Women's team C4-5
| 
| W 2-1
| L 0-2
|Did not advance
|
|-align=center
|align=left|Will BayleyPaul Karabardak
|align=left|Men's team C6-7
|
| W 2-0
| W 2-1
| L 0-2
|
|-align=center
|align=left|Aaron McKibbinBilly ShiltonRoss Wilson
|align=left|Men's team C8
| 
| W 2-0
| L 0-2
|Did not advance
|
|-align=center
|align=left|Ashley Facey-ThompsonJoshua Stacey
|align=left|Men's team C9-10
| W 2-0
| L 0-2
|colspan=3|Did not advance
|}

Taekwondo

Great Britain qualified three athletes to compete at the Paralympics competition. Amy Truesdale being the first British para taekwondo athlete who qualified for the first time at this games after placing first in the world ranking. Meanwhile, two other athletes qualified by winning the gold medal at the 2021 European Qualification Tournament in Sofia, Bulgaria.

Wheelchair basketball

The British women's basketball team have qualified for Tokyo 2020 Paralympics after the women's team won the silver medal in the 2019 European Wheelchair Basketball Championships.

Men's squad

Women's tournament

Wheelchair fencing

On 28 June 2021, Paralympics GB announced the selection of the four fencers who would represent Great Britain in Tokyo.

Individual

Teams

Wheelchair rugby

Great Britain national wheelchair rugby team qualified for the Games for the games by finishing top two at the 2019 European Championship Division A in Vejle.

Squad
On 2 June 2021, the full Great Britain squad for the tournament was announced

 Chris Ryan (cc)
 Gavin Walker (cc)
 Ayaz Bhuta Jonathan Coggan Ryan Cowling Nicholas Cummins Kylie Grimes Aaron Phipps Jim Roberts Stuart Robinson Jack Smith Jamie Stead'''
cc = co-captain

Standings - Group B

Group stage

Semi final

Final (gold-medal match)

Wheelchair tennis

Great Britain qualified seven players entries for wheelchair tennis. Six of them qualified by the world rankings, while one of them qualified by received the bipartite commission invitation allocation quotas.

See also
Great Britain at the Paralympics
Great Britain at the 2020 Summer Olympics

References

Nations at the 2020 Summer Paralympics
2020
2021 in British sport